This page is an overview of Uzbekistan at the UCI Track Cycling World Championships.

2015 UCI Track Cycling World Championships 

Uzbekistan competed at the 2015 UCI Track Cycling World Championships in Saint-Quentin-en-Yvelines at the Vélodrome de Saint-Quentin-en-Yvelines from 18–22 February 2015. A team of 1 cyclists (0 women, 1 men) represented the country in the event.

Results

Men

Sources

References

Uzbekistan at cycling events
Nations at the UCI Track Cycling World Championships